Marco Antonio Reyes Nevarez (born 24 November 1987) is a Mexican professional boxer. Reyes is trained by former world champion Roberto García.

Professional career
On June 12, 2010, Reyes beat veteran Jose Luis Zertuche by eleventh round K.O.

On August 21, 2010, Reyes defeated Miguel Angel Tena by third round K.O. On September 15, 2010, Reyes defeated Victor Villereal by second round T.K.O. Then Reyes defeated Martin Avila by second-round T.K.O. On January 1, 2011, Reyes defeated Rito Ruvalcaba by first-round T.K.O.

On June 4, 2011, he achieved victory over the experienced Christian "Olimpico" Solano by knockout in the fourth round.

Professional boxing record

Professional championships

|-

|-

References

External links

People from Chihuahua City
Boxers from Chihuahua (state)
Middleweight boxers
Light-middleweight boxers
1987 births
Living people
Mexican male boxers